Betsy Fogle is an American politician serving as a member of the Missouri House of Representatives from the 135rd district. Elected in November 2020, she assumed office in January 2021.

Early life and education 
Fogle was born in Springfield and attended Parkview High School. She earned a bachelor's degree from Missouri State University and a Master of Arts in sociology from the University of Arkansas.

Career 
Fogle worked at Jordan Valley Community Health Center until she was urged by House Minority Leader Crystal Quade to run for office. Fogle was narrowly elected in November 2020 over incumbent representative Steve Helms and Green Party candidate Vicke Kepling. Fogle's victory resulted in the only seat flipping between either party in the state during the 2020 election cycle.

Electoral history

References 

Living people
Democratic Party members of the Missouri House of Representatives
21st-century American politicians
Year of birth missing (living people)
Women state legislators in Missouri
21st-century American women politicians